Brachionidium elegans is a species of orchid. It is found in Ecuador and Peru.

References

External links 
 Brachionidium elegans at The Plant List
 Brachionidium elegans at Tropicos

elegans
Orchids of Ecuador
Orchids of Peru
Plants described in 1986